Epibryon is a genus of fungi, and the sole genus in the monogeneric family Epibryaceae. It has about 40 species. Many of the species grow parasitically on bryophytes. The genus was circumscribed by mycologist Peter Döbbeler in 1978; the family by Soili Stenroos and Cécile Gueidan in 2014.

Species
Epibryon andinum 
Epibryon arachnoideum 
Epibryon bryophilum 
Epibryon bubakii 
Epibryon casaresii 
Epibryon chorisodontii 
Epibryon conductrix 
Epibryon craspedum 
Epibryon cryptosphaericum 
Epibryon dawsoniae 
Epibryon deceptor 
Epibryon diaphanum 
Epibryon dicrani 
Epibryon elegantissimum 
Epibryon endocarpum 
Epibryon eremita 
Epibryon filiforme 
Epibryon hepaticicola 
Epibryon hypophyllum 
Epibryon intercapillare 
Epibryon intercellulare 
Epibryon interlamellare 
Epibryon intracellulare 
Epibryon kondratyukii 
Epibryon leucobryi 
Epibryon lichenicola 
Epibryon maculosum 
Epibryon marsupidii 
Epibryon metzgeriae 
Epibryon muscicola 
Epibryon notabile 
Epibryon odontophilum 
Epibryon parvipunctum 
Epibryon pedinophylli 
Epibryon perrumpens 
Epibryon plagiochilae 
Epibryon platycarpum 
Epibryon pogonati-urnigeri 
Epibryon polyphagum 
Epibryon polysporum 
Epibryon pulchellum 
Epibryon scapaniae 
Epibryon semitectum 
Epibryon solorinae 
Epibryon trichostomi 
Epibryon tripartitum 
Epibryon turfosorum 
Epibryon ventrale

References

Eurotiomycetes
Eurotiomycetes genera
Taxa described in 1978